Türkiyemspor may refer to:
Türkiyemspor Berlin
Türkiyemspor Amsterdam